Feraoun or Far'un is name of a town in the province of Tulkarm in northern of West bank and also another town belonging to a Béjaïa in northern Algeria.2

References

2.https://www.palestineremembered.com/GeoPoints/Far_un_1124/Article_8384.html

Communes of Béjaïa Province
Béjaïa Province